Dorina Neave, Lady Neave (1880–1955) was the writer of three books about Turkey.

Life

In Turkey
Born Dorina Lockhart Clifton, she was taken by her father, George H. Clifton, to the Ottoman Empire in her early years, as he worked for the Supreme Consular Court there. They resided in the "Edip Efendi Yali", one of the "water mansions" of Istanbul built on the shores of the Bosphorus in the Tulip period. She wrote three books linked to her time in Turkey. Twenty-six Years on the Bosphorus and Romance of the Bosphorus (a "literary classic") are reminiscences of her life in Istanbul during the reign of Sultan Abdul Hamid II, while Remembering Kut  is an account of the devastating Siege of Kut during the First World War on the Turkish Front. A Turkish translation of Twenty-six Years on the Bosphorus was published in 1978, and another in 2008 in a series called "The Turks through the Eyes of the West". Dorina spent her last summer in Turkey in 1907, and on 26 August (her birthday) that year, she left.

In Britain
Soon after returning to England, Dorina met her future husband, Sir Thomas Neave, 5th Baronet. After their marriage in November 1908, she settled with her husband at Dagnam Park, his house in Essex, with a second home in Anglesey (Llys Dulas Manor, slightly north of Dulas Bay). She is well known for building the stone shelter on the island, Ynys Dulas although this is not true because she was born in 1880 and the tower is dated 1821 now a listed building  built by the then owner of Llys Dulas Estate, Colonel James Hughes]. Her English home was near Noak Hill and Lady Neave played a full role in the life of the village. She is remembered in Romford by the foundation stone of an extension to the Victoria Cottage Hospital in Pettits Lane, which she laid in the 1930s.

Sir Thomas Neave died in 1940. That winter, Dagnam Park was requisitioned for the use of the army. Some of Lady Dorina's Turkish friends came to help her pack up her belongings. Her dower house (Dagnam Priory) and Llys Dulas had also been requisitioned, leaving Lady Dorina homeless. Fortunately, she was able to find a flat in Albany, Piccadilly. When Anthony Eden opened the Turkish House (Londra Türk Halkevi) in Fitzhardinge Street to foster Anglo-Turkish relations, he requested Lady Dorina's help. Sir Wyndham Deedes, the Chairman of the Halkevi, asked her to undertake the social side of the Turkish House. The fortnightly Turkish Ladies' "At Homes" which she organized became a popular feature, attended by society ladies, representatives of all the British Armed Services and, when America came into the war, many of the officers and members of the American Embassy.

Apart from her books about Turkey, Lady Dorina has historical significance as the last of the "landed gentry" to live in Dagnam Park, before the policies of Britain's post-war Labour government constrained her to reside in her second home in Anglesey, owing to a compulsory purchase order made by the LCC. This, however, would lead to the demise of the property and its eventual demolition in 1950. Many features of the estate are only remembered via Lady Dorina's memoirs, including a bathing pool which locals originally believed to be a fish pond. The Neaves sold Llys Dulas in the early 1950s. Lady Dorina is buried in the cemetery at St Thomas's Church, Noak Hill. Dorina Neave - a breed of rose - is named after her.

Publications
Twenty-six Years on the Bosphorus. London: Grayson & Grayson, 1933.
Remembering Kut: "Lest We Forget". London: Arthur Barker, 1937.
Romance of the Bosphorus: Reminiscences of Life in Turkey. London: Hutchinson, 1949.

References

External links
Friends of Dagnam Park

1880 births
1955 deaths
English memoirists
English orientalists
British women memoirists
Wives of baronets
British expatriates in the Ottoman Empire